Tongli Publishing Co. (Chinese: 東立出版社, Hanyu Pinyin: Dōng Lì Chūbǎnshè), most known as Tong Li Comics, is a publishing company which distributes a variety of domestic and imported comics in Taiwan.

History

Tong Li was founded in Tainan, Taiwan in 1977 with a mere nine employees. Tong Li entered the publishing business as a seller of illegally copied comic books. "For fifteen years, Tong Li was the largest producer of pirated comics, redoing more than 1,000 titles in all, and for part of that time, fifty a month."

Tong Li's original method of operation was to procure new comics from Japanese distributors, replacing the Japanese text with traditional Chinese, and "drawing bras on bare-breasted women characters and modifying, up to what they could get away with, explicitly sexual or violent panels". The head of Tong Li, Fang Wan-nan(范萬楠), "jokingly referred to himself as the 'king of pirated comics'".

Despite the copyright violation trend, Tong Li procured Taiwan's first legal license for Japanese manga with Minako Narita's Cipher from Hakusensha in 1989, and followed with Katsuhiro Otomo's Akira from Kodansha in 1991. A 1992 Taiwanese law strengthening the copyright enforcement of comics forced Tong Li to abandon the copying and develop original content in addition to acquiring licenses through legal means, at which point it began publishing the magazines Dragon Youth (龍少年月刊) and Star★Girls (星少女月刊) - titles which retained the considerable influence of Japanese manga. It currently releases over 100 licensed manga titles a month includes One Piece, Bleach, Naruto, Sket Dance, Hunter x Hunter, Gintama, Shijō Saikyō no Deshi Ken'ichi, Skip Beat, and more.

Manga Magazines published by Tong Li Publishing
Dragon Youth Comic
New Youth Express
New Youth Express Monthly
Formosa Youth
Young Flower
Star Girls
New Youth Weekly

See also
 List of companies of Taiwan

References

External links

Mass media companies of Taiwan
Comic book publishing companies of China
Manhua distributors
Publishing companies established in 1977
1977 establishments in Taiwan
Manga distributors